Pachymerium tabacarui is a species of centipede in Geophilidae family that is endemic to Romania. The original description of this species is based on a female specimen from the Carpathians measuring 15 mm in length with 53 pairs of legs. Some authorities consider this description consistent with a juvenile specimen of P. ferrugineum and therefore deem P. tabacarui to be a junior synonym of that species. Extensive investigations in the Carpathian region have failed to collect any more specimens.

References

Geophilomorpha
Animals described in 1968
Endemic fauna of Romania
Myriapods of Europe